Stefan Lassen (born 1 November 1985) is a Danish professional ice hockey defenseman who currently plays for Almtuna IS in the HockeyAllsvenskan (Allsv).

Playing career
Lassen began his career in Danish side Herning Blue Fox where he won the Danish Championship in 2007 and 2008. He moved to Sweden in 2009 with Leksands IF of the HockeyAllsvenskan before joining Elitserien club, Djurgårdens IF the following season on 31 May 2010.

After a season stint in the EBEL with Austrian club, Graz 99ers, Lassen moved to Finland signing a two-year contract with the Lahti Pelicans of the Liiga on 27 March 2015.

Lassen played for three years with the Pelicans, captaining the club in the 2017–18 season, before leaving the club to sign an initial one-year contract with Swedish club, Almtuna IS of the HockeyAllsvenskan, on 19 September 2018.

International play
Lassen has participated in two IIHF World Championships before joining Leksands IF in May 2009. Lassen was named for the Danish team again in the 2010 IIHF World Championship. He scored the game-winning goal against USA in the preliminary round.

Career statistics

Regular season and playoffs

References

External links
 

1985 births
Living people
Almtuna IS players
Danish ice hockey defencemen
Djurgårdens IF Hockey players
Frederikshavn White Hawks players
Graz 99ers players
Herning Blue Fox players
Lahti Pelicans players
Leksands IF players
Malmö Redhawks players